Sintang Regency is a regency of West Kalimantan province of Indonesia. It covers an area of 21,638.2 km2, and had a population of 364,759 at the 2010 Census and 421,306 at the 2020 Census; the official estimate as at mid 2021 was 423,674. It is one of the few Indonesian regencies having a land border with other countries. It is also the second largest regency in the province by land area after Landak Regency. The regency was formerly the site of the Sintang Kingdom, a Hindu kingdom that later converted to Islam and which was a regional power in the interior of Borneo Island. The regency seat is located at large town of Sintang, which is among the biggest settlements in Borneo's interior alongside Putussibau and Puruk Cahu.

History 
Somewhere between 45,000 and 39,000 B.C. Sintang would be inhabited by humans. The area would change hands several times from the Majapahit to the Bruneian Sultanate, but when the Dutch arrived at Borneo in 1776 the area would quickly be occupied by the Dutch

The area was occupied by the Empire of Japan in 1941 as a result of WW2, and then would be liberated in 1945. This was followed by Indonesian Independence.

Geography

Climate 
Sintang, the seat of the regency has a tropical rainforest climate (Af) with heavy to very heavy rainfall year-round.

Governance

Administrative Districts 
Following the separation of the former southern part (eleven districts) to form the separate Melawi Regency on 18 December 2003, the residual Sintang Regency consists of fourteen districts (kecamatan), tabulated below with their areas and their populations at the 2010 Census and 2020 Census, together with the official estimates as at mid 2021.

Economy

Demographics

Infrastructure

Education 
There are 193 kindergartens, 456 elementary schools, 142 junior highschools, and 44 senior highschools. In addition, there are 18 vocational highschools. The regency has total 10 universities and higher education institutions as of 2020, most of which are located in town of Sintang. One of the most notable in the regency is Kapuas Sintang University, located in Sintang district. The university is private and located close to Kapuas River. It was previously known as Panca Bhakti Teaching and Education College before becoming a university. Muhammadiyah University in Pontianak also has campus branch in Sintang, which is also private. Other colleges in the regency include Christian theological schools such as Sintang Khatulistiwa Theological College, Injili Setia Sintang Theological College, Kapuas Raya Christian College, and Immanuel Sintang Kalbar Theological College. In addition, there is a public nurse academy owned by West Kalimantan provincial government and one private Islamic college, Ma'arif Sintang Islamic College. 

The regency government also runs regional library, located on town of Sintang.

References

Regencies of West Kalimantan